Alvand Rural District may refer to:
 Alvand Rural District (Qasr-e Shirin County), West Azerbaijan province
 Alvand Rural District (Khorramdarreh County), Zanjan province